WEII (96.3 FM, "SportsRadio 96.3") is a radio station in Dennis, Massachusetts. The station airs a sports radio format from Boston-based WEEI-FM. It is owned by iHeartMedia.

The station started life in 1981 under the call letters WGTF, operating on 93.5 FM. It moved to 96.3 in 1982 (the 93.5 frequency is now occupied by WFRQ) and changed its call letters to WXJY in 1984 and WNTX in 1988. The station's format as WNTX was "Oldies 96", competing with the larger "Oldies 103" in Boston.  The Makkay family, headed by Al Makkay, purchased the frequency in late 1992, and in January 1993, it flipped to a Top 40 (CHR) format, rebranded as WRZE "96.3 The Rose". In 2003, Makkay Broadcasting sold WRZE, along with its sister stations WPXC and WCIB, to Qantum Communications for $32 million. In 2008, the station, which was originally licensed to Nantucket, was re-licensed to Dennis.

On March 25, 2009 (though the changeover was originally announced for April 1), WRZE flipped formats, becoming a simulcast of popular Boston sports radio station WEEI.

On May 15, 2014, Qantum Communications announced that it would sell its 29 stations, including WEII, to Clear Channel Communications (now iHeartMedia), in a transaction connected to Clear Channel's sale of WALK AM-FM in Patchogue, New York to Connoisseur Media via Qantum. The transaction was consummated on September 9, 2014.

References

External links

EII
EII
Sports radio stations in the United States
Dennis, Massachusetts
IHeartMedia radio stations
Radio stations established in 1981
1981 establishments in Massachusetts
ESPN Radio stations